"A Breach in the Wall" is a 1967 TV play by Ray Lawler. It aired for British TV and screened in Australia as part of Wednesday Theatre. Australian TV drama was relatively rare at the time.

It is about the remains of Thomas a'Beckett being discovered behind a church wall.

Plot
In the near future, the parish church of the Kentish village of Valham is undergoing long-overdue restoration - restoration largely made possible by the fund-raising efforts of the able and radical young incumbent, Lewis Patterson. A walled-in chamber is discovered and within it is a coffin sealed with the crest of Becket.

Cast
 Robert Harris as the Archhbishop
 Barry Justice as Reverend Lewis Patterson
 John Phillips as Cardinal Runan
 Rosemary Leach as Katharine Elliott
 Paul Hardwick as Canon Charles Humphrey
 Jennifer Daniel as Sue Patterson
 Kynaston Reeves as Dr. Matthews
 John Bryans as Dr. Sadler
 John Kidd as Dr. Aslam
 Frances Alger as Eunice Street
 Donald Morley as Brian Tracy
 Hilda Braid as Mrs. Street
 William Moore as Constable Howell
 Barbara Graley as Miss Spain
 Nicholas Brent as Eddie Street
 John Tatham as Bourke

Production
Lawler said "I don't pretend that this is necessarily how events would
shape themselves if the situation arose. But I do believe that the historical significance of Thomas A'Beckct is contained in certain words from the play: 'A saint is somebody who spends his life on earth in bringing mankind nearer heaven, and his life hereafter bringing heaven nearer men'."

References

External links
 Wednesday Theatre at IMDb
 A Breach in the Wall at AustLit

1968 television plays
1968 Australian television episodes
1960s Australian television plays
Wednesday Theatre (season 4) episodes